Valsecchi may refer to:

Davide Valsecchi (born 1987), Italian racing driver
Bagatti Valsecchi Museum, museum in Milan, Italy
3725 Valsecchi, main-belt asteroid